Police Call is a 1933 Pre-code American crime drama film directed by Phil Whitman and starring Nick Stuart and Merna Kennedy.

Cast
Nick Stuart as Dynamite Danny Daniels
Merna Kennedy as Evelyn Hume
Roberta Gale as Nora Daniels
Mary Carr as Mother Daniels
Walter McGrail as Dr. James A. Gordon
Warner Richmond as Sammy
Robert Ellis as Police Chief Crown
Eddie Phillips as Hymie
Harry Myers as Steward
Ralph Freud as Ellsworth
Charles Stevens as Gang Leader
Kit Guard as Trainer

References

External links

Lobby poster (Wayback Machine)

1933 films
American black-and-white films
American crime drama films
1933 drama films
1933 crime drama films
Films directed by Phil Whitman
1930s American films